Oasi (also known as Oasis) is a 1994 Italian romance-drama film written and directed by Cristiano Bortone.

The film was screened out of competition at the 51st edition of the Venice Film Festival.

Plot

Cast 
  Henry Arnold  as Simone
 Valentina Cervi as Claudia 
  Francesca Nunzi  as Angela
 Valentino Macchi as The Father-in-law 
 Alfredo Pea as The Dustman

References

External links

1994 films
Italian romantic drama films
1994 romantic drama films
Films directed by Cristiano Bortone
1994 directorial debut films
1990s Italian films